Emil Weiss (August 14, 1896 – January 6, 1965) was a Czech illustrator.

Life and career 

He was born in Moravia, which was then part of Austria-Hungary, and trained as an architect in Vienna. In Prague, in the 1920s, he worked as a cartoonist for newspapers and as a commercial artist doing advertising. His posters are on display at the Prague Museum of Applied Arts, where reproductions are on sale as posters and even as miniatures on matchbox covers. Weiss also worked as an architect. His style was Art Deco, severely geometrical, with rounded corners, un-decorated, handcrafted of finest materials. All went well until the Depression and then Hitler destroyed that whole world.

In 1938 he sought refuge in Britain, but was denied a working permit until the Nazis invaded Czechoslovakia, whereupon his status changed from visitor to refugee. His personal version of English and his European drawing style made it difficult to find work so at 1943 he started from zero. Due to the difficulty of finding jobs, he accepted most offers, including making wartime propaganda posters, illustrations for Czech publications, and portrait sketches for The Daily Telegraph. He then met Rose Fyleman, author of children's books and poetry, who was doing a serial for the children's page of The Christian Science Monitor in Boston. He illustrated the weekly segments for her and that led him to Saville Davis, then the Monitors London correspondent, who appointed him their London visual reporter. There he covered international events such as the 1946 conference in Lancaster House where the United Nations was born. In 1948 he emigrated to the US and became the Monitors artist-reporter covering national events and politicians both on assignment as well as freelance until his death in 1965.

One of his favorite haunts was the UN in New York, where he was often mistaken for a delegate, with his gracious old-world manner, bow tie, and homburg hat. Thus diplomatically camouflaged, he blended into the background, where he would scribble surreptitious notes on any scrap of paper he found in his pocket. Incredibly quickly he caught and pinned down the personal characteristics of his distinguished subjects by their stance and body language. He then scooted back to his studio where he deftly traced the scribbles using his unique dry-brush technique of ink on vellum paper…  identified the scene in his somewhat inventive spelling… tossed it in an envelope and rushed to catch the Monitor'''s Boston pouch. The drawings bear the working notes of an artist-reporter under deadline. It was not a highly lucrative profession, but he loved its immediacy, its glamor, and the fun of revealing people.

His portrait gallery of some thousand drawings of international personalities is a historic microcosm of the mid-20th Century. Some drawings are straight reportage, some slyly satirical, all expose his victims' singularity. Aside from his portraits, the Monitor published pages'-worth of his article-illustrations as well as sketches from his travels—many from Austria—for which The President of Austria awarded him their Golden Badge of Honor in 1964.

Illustrator of some 40 children's books (originals now in the Kerlan Collection of the University of Minnesota Library) he illustrated Harper & Row's young readers' edition of JFK's Profiles in Courage; Emily Neville's 1964 Newbery medal winner It's like this, cat, Harper & Row, 1963. He was author of My Studio Sketchboook, Marsland, London 1948; with Karla Weiss the children's cookbook Let's have a party, Bruce, London, 1946; as well as Slavische Märchen'', Schweizer Druck und Verlagshaus, Zürich, 1952.

A gentle, funny, trusting, hopelessly impractical humanist, he was also childishly superstitious: believed that if you pronounced the name of a medicine with a Latin accent, its effective strength increased. For lower back pain he advised a sheet of red flannel folded in half and draped over a string that wrapped around the waist. Any other color than red was useless. Tucking it inside the pants would shield the wearer from "looking like a truck with a red flag waving behind." Fortunately his wife, Karla, graduate of the Prague Music Academy, was more practical. She enabled him to do what he simply had to do: to draw. He was never without a pencil in his hand unless he was holding his brush, in which case the pencil was held in his mouth.

Emil Weiss was married to Karla Weiss, a trained concert pianist. They had one son, Jan V. White, the preeminent magazine design consultant known for his book "Editing By Design," the first book on magazine design, one of many he published on that subject. Continuing in the family's design tradition, Jan V. White is the father of Alexander W. White, an eminent educator, typographer, and author of "The Elements of Graphic Design" and several other books on typography and graphic design.

Emil Weiss is buried in Mt. Pleasant Cemetery, Hawthorne, New York.

Illustrations

References

External links
 
 

Czech illustrators
Austrian illustrators
1896 births
1965 deaths
Czech children's book illustrators
Austrian children's book illustrators